Skycycle may refer to:

Skycycle (rock band), an alternative rock band
SkyCycle (concept), a proposed network of cycle paths in London
Skycycle X-2, a steam-powered rocket owned by Evel Knievel
Dart Skycycle, an American aircraft
Carlson Skycycle, an American aircraft

See also
Fly Hard Trikes SkyCycle, an American ultralight trike
Lookout Mountain SkyCycle, an American ultralight trike